Drysdale River National Park is a national park in the Kimberley region of Western Australia,  northeast of Perth.

The park is the largest and least accessible in the Kimberley, with no public road leading to it and no airstrip within its boundaries. Access to the park is gained via the track from Carson River Station from the Kalumburu Road. Permission must be obtained from the Kalumburu Aboriginal Corporation prior to entering the park. There are no visitor facilities or marked walk trails in the park. Rangers do not patrol the park and no food, fuel or mechanical services exist within the park or at Carson River Station.

The park is a good example of untouched Kimberley, wilderness featuring open woodland, gorges, cliffs, and the pools, waterfalls and creeks of the Drysdale River. The park is home to two large waterfalls, Morgan Falls and Solea Falls, with numerous smaller falls along the course of the river.

The area provides habitat for many rare plants and animals. Almost 600 species of plants are known to exist within the park. About 30 of these plants are aquatic and swamp varieties that inhabit the permanent pools found along the Drysdale and Carson Rivers. About 25 species of fern also inhabit the area, two of which are not found elsewhere. Species such as fan palms, kalumbaru gums and paperbarks are also found along the watercourses.

A variety of fauna also exist within the park, including over 100 species of birds, sugar gliders, bats, wallabies, and salt water crocodiles.

The traditional owners of the area that the river flows through are the Ngarinjin, Miwa and Wilawila peoples.

The first European to visit the area was a surveyor with a squatting company, CA Burrowes, who did so in 1886. Both Brockman and Crossland visited the area in separate expeditions in 1901. The first vehicular track was constructed through the region during an expedition and survey in 1954; it ran from Gibb River Station to Kalumburu. The park was gazetted in September 1974, using the boundaries recommended by the Australian Academy of Science committee on National Parks in 1955.

See also
 Protected areas of Western Australia

References

National parks of Western Australia
Kimberley (Western Australia)
Protected areas established in 1974
1974 establishments in Australia
Kimberley tropical savanna